Jan Pokeršnik (born ) is a Slovenian male volleyball player. He is part of the Slovenia men's national volleyball team. He competed at the 2015 Men's European Volleyball Championship. At club level he plays for Beauvais Oise UC.

See also
 Slovenia men's national volleyball team

References

External links
 FIVB 2016 Stats
 WorldOfVolley
 
 
 Under the spotlight: Jan Pokeršnik  (in Slovenian)

1989 births
Living people
Slovenian men's volleyball players
Place of birth missing (living people)